William Godwin (8 August 1912 – 3 February 2000) was a British sports shooter. He competed in the 50 metre rifle, prone event at the 1960 Summer Olympics.

References

1912 births
2000 deaths
British male sport shooters
Olympic shooters of Great Britain
Shooters at the 1960 Summer Olympics
Sportspeople from Birmingham, West Midlands